This article presents a complete catalog of original compositions by Ferruccio Busoni, including a large number of early works, most of which remain unpublished. The earliest preserved pieces were written when he was barely seven years old. Over 200 of the total of 303 original compositions were produced before the age of twenty.

For a more selective list of recorded works, see Ferruccio Busoni discography.

Busoni also produced a number of cadenzas, transcriptions, and editions. For a complete list see List of adaptations by Ferruccio Busoni.

Introductory notes

Opus numbers 
Busoni's opus numbers are confusing. Initially he numbered each work as he wrote it. Upon reaching Op. 40 he began assigning opus numbers of unpublished youthful works to new compositions. Later he started again from Op. 30, adding an "a" to Op. 30 to 36. From Op. 41 the numbering is fairly regular although it bears little relationship to the actual date of composition, and many compositions were published without opus number. Among unpublished compositions, some have two opus numbers. Because of their confusing nature Roberge recommended against using them and eliminated them from his List of Works. However, since opus numbers are written on manuscripts, included on published scores, used for identification of compositions by many recordings, and included in the standard reference works by Dent (1933), Kindermann (1980), Beaumont (1985), and Sitsky (2008), they are given here as an aid in identification. The user should be aware, however, that a particular opus number may refer to more than one item and says very little about the date of composition or publication.

Catalog numbers 
The letters BV (Busoni-Verzeichnis [Busoni Catalog]) followed by a number are used for identification of Busoni's original compositions. The BV numbers are based on the first comprehensive catalog of Busoni's unpublished as well as published works prepared by Jürgen Kindermann. The letters KiV are also sometimes used, as well as the abbreviations Kind- and K. Although Kindermann himself did not specify any letters to be used for referring to his catalog, he has agreed to the use of the abbreviation BV. The catalog is not strictly chronological, since it frequently incorporates published works by the date of publication rather than the date of composition. When the catalog number is preceded by the letters BV B, for example, Ten Chorale Preludes by Bach, BV B 27, it refers to a cadenza, transcription, or adaptation (see List of adaptations by Ferruccio Busoni).

Catalog of original compositions 
Note: This list is not yet complete. The "Details" column needs additional work.
BV catalog numbers are from Roberge. Titles and opus numbers are listed as in Beaumont, except as noted. Titles are in the original language, except for instrumentation and generic terms, such as "string quartet." For example, Beaumont partially translates "Berceuse pour le piano," to "Berceuse, for piano." Additional title information provided by Roberge, for example, a key signature not found in the original title, is sometimes added in parentheses. For works with text, the first line is typically given, followed by the name of the poet in parentheses. Translations, when provided, are in brackets. Dates of composition and durations are from Beaumont, unless otherwise indicated. Dedications are from Roberge.

Busoni Archive: Most of Busoni's unpublished early manuscripts, as well as those of later works, have been preserved in the Busoni-Nachlaß [Busoni-Archive]. The collection consists of 366 cataloged items, many of which were lost during the Second World War, and after the war were divided between Stiftung Preußischer Kulturbesitz, Musikabteilung, in West Berlin and the Deutsche Staatsbibliothek, Musikabteilung, in East Berlin. Kindermann lists the locations and manuscript numbers of each work, for those manuscripts which were available until the year he published his catalog (1980). Some of the lost items reappeared later; most are now at the Jagiellonian University in Cracow. After the fall of the Berlin wall, the two libraries were reunited as the Staatsbibliothek zu Berlin. Sitsky (pp. 363–383) has an appendix listing manuscripts (with numbers, locations, titles and/or a short description), including those lost, which may yet reappear, as well as those not part of the Busoni-Archive, which are either not numbered or are numbered with a different system. The Busoni-Archive manuscript numbers provided by Sitsky are prefixed with the letters "SB", a procedure which has been adopted here as well.

Abbreviations: acc., according to; arr., arrangement; SB, Staatsbibliothek zu Berlin; B&H, Breitkopf & Härtel, Leipzig (unless otherwise indicated); cat., catalog; ded., dedicated to; dur., duration; frag, fragment; fp, first performance; (score), link to score at the International Music Score Library Project; instr., instrumentation; MS, manuscript; pub., published; rev., revised; unpub., unpublished.

BV 1 to 100 

 Go to: BV 101 | BV 201 | Appendix

BV 101 to 200 

 Go to: BV 1 | BV 201 | Appendix

BV 201 to 303 

 Go to: BV 1 | BV 101 | Appendix
 Note: This section is not yet complete. The "Details" column needs additional work.

Appendix 

 Go to: BV 1 | BV 101 | BV 201
This section lists additional original works not assigned numbers in the Kindermann catalog. They are listed in the order given in Roberge (pp. 45–46) with one additional item (no. 9).

Catalog details 
This section contains detailed information for selected catalog items.

^ BV 42: String quartet no. 2 (in F minor)
Comprises: 4 movements
1) Allegro Agitato
2) Andante Sostenuto
3) Scherzo - Trio
4) Allegro Vivace
MS: SB53 (4 pages score)
Title: 2º Quartetto composto da Ferruccio Benvenuto Busoni
Ded: Al mio amatissimo padre (Ferdinando Busoni).
Date: Scritto il 28 Aprile 1876 (at the end of the 1st movement).
Pub: unpublished
Ref: Kindermann, pp. 43-44; Roberge, p. 11; Beaumont, p. 357.

^ BV 45: Il Dolore: Romanza senza parole [Sorrow: Romance without words] (in A minor), for piano
Tempo: Andante
MS: SB40 (6 pages score)
Ded: Alla Memoria dell' Illustrissimo Signor Barone Hermann de Todesco.
Date: Composta il 21 Giugno 1876 all'età di anni 10 in Gmunden.
MS: SB N. Mus. ms. 120 (copy of SB40)
Title: Der Schmerz. Lied ohne Worte für Klavier allein, componirt von dem 10jährigen Ferruccio Benvenuto Busoni.
Ded: Zur Erinnerung an den Herrn Baron Hermann von Todesco.
Date: Scritta il 21 Giugno 1876 all'età di anni 10.
Ref: Kindermann, pp. 45-46; Roberge, p. 11; Beaumont, p. 357; Sitsky, pp. 13, 364, 380.

^ BV 48: Gavottina (in F major) Op. 3 no. 3, for piano
MS: SB55 (2 pages); SB56 "Gavotta" is identical to SB55.
Date: Scritta l'11 Novembre 1876 all'età di anni 10 e mezzo a Vienna.
Note: This piece was probably intended for BV 71 (Beaumont).
Ref: Kindermann, p. 47; Beaumont, p. 358; Sitsky, p. 364.

^ BV 51 Ouverture (in E major), for (large) orchestra (unfinished)
Tempi: Moderato - Allegro
MS: SB58 (title page, 25 pages score) (fragment)
Title: Ouverture per Grande Orchestra composta da Ferr. Weiß-Busoni
Date: Composta nell'anno 1876 in Vienna.
Instrumentation: 2 flutes, 2 oboes, 2 clarinets, 2 bassoons; 2 horns, 2 trumpets, 2 trombones, bass trombone; timpani, tubular bells, harp; strings
Pub: unpublished
Arrangement: piano duet, see BV 128
Ref: Kindermann, pp. 48-49; Roberge, p. 12; Beaumont, p. 357.

^ BV 57: Sonata (No. 4 in F minor)? (unfinished)
Alternative titles:
1) Zwei Kompositionen in d-Moll und f-Moll für Pianoforte (Kindermann)
2) Two Pieces in D minor and F minor for Piano (fragments) (Roberge)
3) 2 pieces Op. 6, for piano (Beaumont)
4) Sonata fragment Op. 6 (Sitsky)
MS: SB78
Comprises:
1) Titlepage: "Op. 6"
2) Piece in D minor (3 pages, fragment)
3) Piece in F minor (5 pages, fragment)
Notes:
1) On the last page of (3) is written: "Sonata 4ª"
2) On the first page of (3) are listed:
Iª Sonata Do magg: [probably BV 58
IIª Sonata Re magg: [probably BV 61]
IIIª Sonata Mi magg: [probably BV 65]
IVª Sonata Fa min: [probably this work, BV 57]
Vª Sonata [to] IXª Sonata [all without indication of key]
This list probably refers to an intended set of sonatas which was never completed. (Kindermann, Sitsky)
Ref: Kindermann, pp. 51-52; Sitsky, pp. 23-24; Roberge, p. 12; Beaumont, p. 358.

^ BV 58: Sonata No. 1 in C major Op. 7, for piano
MS: ' SB64 (Title page; 1 blank page; no.1: 3 pages; 2 blank pages; nos. 2-4: 6 pages; 2 blank pages)
Comprises:
1) Allegro con brio
2) Andante mosso
3) (Menuet) - Trio
4) (no tempo marking; 2/4)
Title: Sonata No. 1 in Do magg: Op. 7 Composta da Ferruccio Benvenuto Busoni
Date: il 20 Maggio 1877 all' età di anni undici e 2 mesi in tempo sua malattia
Note: This sonata was probably intended to be part of a set of at least 9 sonatas, never completed (see BV 57).
Ref: Kindermann, pp. 52-53; Sitsky, pp. 23-24; Roberge, p. 12; Beaumont, p. 358.

^ BV 61: Sonata No. 2 in D major Op. 8, for piano
MS: SB67 (Title page; 21 pages score; 1 blank page)
Comprises:
1) Allegro con fuoco
2) Andante con Variazione: Andante con moto quasi Andantino
3) Andante - Allegro Vivace
Title: Sonata No. 2 in Re magg: Composta per il pianoforte. Op. 8 da Ferruccio Benvenuto Busoni
Date: il 5 Luglio 1877 in Gmunden all' età di anni 11.
Note:
1) This sonata was probably intended to be part of a set of at least 9 sonatas, never completed (see BV 57).
2) BV 62 may originally have been intended to be part of this sonata (Beaumont).
Ref: Kindermann, pp. 54-55; Sitsky, pp. 23-24; Roberge, p. 12; Beaumont, p. 358.

^ BV 62: Scherzo (in F-sharp minor), for piano
Tempo: Presto
MS: G. Ricordi, Milan
Title: Scherzo, tratto dalla Sonata Op. 8 in Mi magg: composto da Ferruccio Benv. Busoni
[Scherzo from the Sonata Op. 8 in E major, composed by Ferruccio Benvenuto Busoni]
Ded: All'Illustre Critico Sigr. Filippo Dr. Filippi.
Date: Gmunden, (Austr. Sup.) Luglio 1877
Pub: F. Lucca, Milan, 1882, plate. no. Z 35468 Z, (5 pages)
Title: Scherzo per pianoforte tratto dalla Sonata Op. 8 in Mi Maggiore
Ded: All'Illustre Critico Cavaliere Filippo Dottr. Filippi.
Notes:
1) Scherzo movement probably originally intended for the Sonata No. 3 in E major Op. 9, BV 65 (Sitsky); or the Sonata No. 2 in D major Op. 8, BV 61 (Beaumont).
2) According to Busoni's handwritten catalog of works (ca. 1881) the piece was composed on 5 July 1877.
3) Publication was announced on 16 September 1882 in L'Arte, Trieste.
Ref: Kindermann, pp. 55-56; Sitsky, p. 41; Beaumont, p. 358.

^ BV 64: Preludio (in E minor), for piano
Tempo: Andante sostenuto
MS: SB68 (1 page)
Title: Preludio
Date: Gmunden den 4 September 1877 (at the end of the composition).
Text: "Du bist wie eine Blume" (Heinrich Heine) ["You are like a flower"]
Note: The text by Heine appears in the piano part rather than the title.
Ref: Kindermann, p. 57; Roberge, p. 13; Beaumont, p. 358; Sitsky, p. 365.

^ BV 65: Sonata No. 3 in E major Op. 9, for piano (unfinished)
MS: SB69
Title: Sonata No. 3 in Mi magg: Op. 9
Comprises:
1) (no tempo marking; E major; 4/4; 8 pages)
2) one intervening title page: Sonata Nº 3 Mi maggiore
3) Finale (E major; 6/8; sketch, 6 pages)
Date: Composta il 14 September 1877 (at the end of the composition).
Notes:
1) BV 62 was probably originally to be part of this sonata (Sitsky).
2) This sonata was probably intended to be part of a set of at least 9 sonatas, never completed (see BV 57).
Ref: Kindermann, pp. 57-58; Roberge, p. 13; Beaumont, p. 358; Sitsky, pp. 41, 365.

^ BV 67: "Ave Maria," (Antiphon) Op. 1, for voice and piano
MS: unknown
Comp: 1 October 1977 (set Note 1)
Pub: Vienna: C. A. Spina and Hamburg: August Cranz, n.d. [1878 (Dent)], plate no. C.24586, (5 pages)
Title: Ave Maria per Canto accompagnamento dir Pianoforte, Op. 1
Ded: Omaggio al celebre Tenore Cav. Angelo Masini
Notes:
1) Date of composition for this work is written on the first page of ms SB360 (BV 50): "Ave Maria 1/10/77"
2) According to Busoni's handwritten catalog of works (ca. 1881) the piece was composed in 1877 in Gmunden.
Ref: Kindermann, pp. 58-59; Dent, p. 345; Roberge, p. 13; Beaumont, p. 358.

^ BV 71: Cinq Pièces [Five Pieces] Op. 3, for piano
Comprises:
1) Preludio: Andante
2) Minuetto - Trio
3) Gavotta - Trio
4) Etude: Allegretto con moto
5) Gigue: Allegro
Comp: 1877
MS: unknown
Pub: Leipzig: August Cranz, n.d. [1877 (Dent)], plate nos. C.24541 to C.24545, (3, 5, 5, 5, and 7 pages)
First performance: Vienna and Baden, 1878; Ferruccio Busoni, piano
Notes:
1) According to Busoni's handwritten catalog of works (ca. 1881) this piece was composed in 1877 in Vienna.
2) This is Busoni's first published work.
Ref: Dent, p. 340; Kindermann, pp. 61-63; Roberge, p. 13; Beaumont, p. 358; Sitsky, pp. 40-41.

^ BV 72: Andante con moto (in E minor) Op. 10, for clarinet and piano
Alternative titles:
1) Komposition in e-Moll für Klarinette und Pianoforte (Kindermann)
2) Suite in E minor for Clarinet and Piano (Roberge)
3) Suite Op. 10, for clarinet and piano (Beaumont)
Comprises: Andante con moto (in E minor) (4/4, 80 bars) (one movement only)
MS: SB79
Page inventory:
Full score: Title page; 3 pages score (clarinet in C; piano); 1 blank page; 2 pages score
Clarinet part in C: both sides of a single sheet
Title: Klarinetten-Suite, Op. 10
Date: 1877.
Pub: Munich: G. Henle Verlag, 1992; cat. no. HN 467; ed. by Georg Meerwein
Title: Andante con moto
Full score: pp. 1-3 (clarinet in C; piano)
Clarinet part: p. 1 (in B-flat); p. 18 (in C).
Note: Between measures 40 and 41 the full score and the clarinet part of the manuscript have an additional 14 bars not included in the published score. These were later stricken from the ms full score. The clarinet part notates this section in "two-part texture." (Meerwein)
Ref: Meerwein, Full score: pp. vi-vii (Preface), 53 (Comments); Kindermann, p. 63; Beaumont, p. 359; Roberge, p. 13; Sitsky, p. 365.

^ BV 203: Six études Op. 16, for piano
Comprises:
Etüde 1. Allegro deciso
Etüde 2. Allegro moderato
Etüde 3. Moderato
Etüde 4. Allegro vivace e con fuoco
Etüde 5. (Fuga.) Allegro giusto
Etüde 6. Scherzo. Vivacissimo, energico, feroce
Comp: 1883 (B.)
Manuscript: Unknown
Publications:
1) Vienna: Albert J. Gutmann, n.d. [1883 (D.)], cat. no. A.J.G. 614, plate no. 8285, (29 pages)
2) No. 5 only: Vienna: Albert J. Gutmann, Copyright 1884 by G. Schirmer, New York, cat. no. 530, (8 pages)
3) Leipzig: Breitkopf & Härtel, Copyright 1886 by G. Schirmer, New York, cat. no. EB 5079, plate no. 28468 (29 pages)
4) No. 5 only: [Leipzig: Breitkopf & Härtel], Copyright 1886 by G. Schirmer, New York, plate no. A.J.G. 530, (8 pages)
5) Reprint: Wiesbaden-Leipzig-Paris: Breitkopf & Härtel, n.d. [1950? or later], cat. no. 5079, plate no. 28468, (29 pages)
6) Nos. 2-4: Moscow: Muzyka, 1969, ed. Grigorii Kogan (R.)
Dedication: Johannes Brahms
First performances:
1) Graz, 21 October 1883; (no. 5 only); Ferruccio Busoni, piano. (R.)
2) Vienna, 1884; (only 2 of the 6); Ferruccio Busoni, piano (D.)
Ref: Dent, pp. 46, 341; Kindermann, pp. 163-165; Sitsky, p. 47; Beaumont, p. 365; Roberge, p. 26.

BV 204: Sonate f-moll Op. 20 für Klavier [Sonata in F minor, Op. 20, for piano]
Comprises:
1) Allegro risoluto vivace ed energico
2) Andante con moto
3) Nella guesa d'un'improvvisazione - Allegro fugato
Manuscript: SB187 (Sonate Op. 20)
Dedication: Anton Rubinstein gewidmet
Dated: Vienna Natale 1883 [Vienna, Christmas, 1883] (at the end of the manuscript)
First performance: Vienna, Bösendorfer Saal, 6 March 1884; Ferruccio Busoni, piano
Publication: B&H, 1983, as Op. 20a, ed. Jutta Theurich
Recording: Wolf Harden, piano (Naxos 8572077)
Ref: Dent, p. 341; Kindermann. pp. 165–166; Sitsky, p. 26; Beaumont, p. 365; Roberge, p. 26.

BV 241: [6] Stücke [Pieces] Op. 33b, for piano
Comprises:
Series I (ded. Max Reger):
1) Schwermut [Melancholy]
2) Frohsinn [Gaiety],
3) Scherzino [Little Scherzo]
Series II (ded. Isabella Stewart Gardner):
4) Fantasia in modo antico [Fantasia in antique style]. Allegro risoluto
5) Finnische Ballade [Finnish Ballade]
6) Exeunt omnes [Everyone exits]
Composed: 1895 (Beaumont)
Manuscript: Busoni Archive No.223 (sketches)
Title: Finnische Ballade
4 sheets, notated on one side only, attached
Publications:
1) Leipzig: C. F. Peters, Copyright 1896, cat. no. 2838, plates 8222 (nos. 1-3); 8223 (nos. 4-6), 36 pages
2) Helsinki: Fazer, 1957 (no. 6 only, with a note by Roberto Wis)
3) Moscow: Muzyka, 1969 (nos. 1, 2, 4, 5, ed. Grigorii Kogan)
4) Frankfurt, New York, and London: C. F. Peters, 1982
Ref: Dent, p. 342; Kindermann, pp. 213-216; Beaumont, p. 368; Roberge, p. 31.

^ BV 274: Sonatina in diem nativitatis Christi MCMXVII für Klavier zu zwei Händen
MS:
1) Wiesbaden: Breitkopf & Härtel (dated 22 December 1917, at the end of the composition)
2) SB304 (dated 19 December 1917; 21 December 1917, at the end)
Dedication: "An Benvenuto" (Benvenuto Busoni)
Pub:
1) Leipzig: Breitkopf & Härtel, Copyright 1918, cat. no. EB 5071, plate no. 27744, (9 pages)
2) Leipzig: VEB Breitkopf & Härtel, [1949] (reprint)
3) Wiesbaden: Breitkopf & Härtel, [1960 or later] (reprint)
4) Milan: Ricordi, 1986.
First performance: Tonhalle, Zürich (?); 24 January 1910; Ferruccio Busoni, piano.
Ref: Kindermann, pp. 331-332; Dent, p. 344; Roberge, p. 39; Beaumont, pp. 251, 370; Sitsky, pp. 79, 376, 381.

Clarinet and piano compilation 

 Ferruccio Busoni: Early Character Pieces for Clarinet and Piano
 Pub: Munich: G. Henle Verlag; 1992; cat. no. HN 467; edited by Georg Meerwein; fingering of piano part by Klaus Schilde.
 Note: clarinet in B-flat, except as noted (cl = clarinet; pf = piano)
 Contents: full score (cl & pf); instrumental part (cl)
 Preface, p. V-VIII (full score only; by Georg Meerwein, Bamberg, autumn 1991)
 Andante con moto (BV 72), pp. 1-3 (cl in C & pf); p. 2 (cl in B-flat), p. 18 (cl in C)
 Suite (BV 88):
 Improvvisata [Impromptu]: Allegro, pp. 4-6; p. 3
 Barcarola: Allegretto, pp. 7-9; p. 4
 Elegia: Adagio, pp. 10-12; p. 5
 Danza campestre, pp. 13-17; pp. 6-7
 Tema variato: Andante sostenuto, pp. 18-21; pp. 7-8
 Serenata, pp. 22-24; p. 9
 Solo dramatique: Allegro maestoso (BV 101), pp. 25-30; pp. 10-11
 Andantino (BV 107), pp. 31-34; pp. 12-13
 Serenade (BV 108), pp. 35-40; pp. 14-15
 Novellette: Allegro (BV 116), pp. 41-51; pp. 16-17
 Comments, pp. 53-55 (full score only; by Georg Meerwein)

Biographical notes 

 Caroline (or Karoline) Bettelheim (1843-1891), wife of Julius Gomperz. Born in Hungary in humble circumstances, she became a pianist, sang at the Carltheater in Vienna, and from 1872 as a contralto at the Vienna Hofoper. After her marriage she gave up singing in public except at charity events. (Dent, p. 21; Beaumont, p. 16.)
 Anna Weiß-Busoni (13 January 1833 – 3 October 1909), Ferruccio Busoni's mother, was a well-known professional pianist. She and his father Ferdinando, a clarinet player, toured together frequently while Ferruccio was still a young boy. She also initiated piano, violin, and toy flute lessons with her young son not long before to his fourth birthday, when the family was living in Paris. (Dent, pp. 5, 10, 190.)
 Benvenuto Busoni (24 May 1892 - 1976), the first of Ferruccio Busoni's two sons, was born in Boston while his father held a post at the New England Conservatory of Music. He became a painter as an adult and on 28 January 1922 married Henriette Rinderknecht, a seamstress from Zurich. It has been said that he chose to marry her because she had never heard of his father. He died in Berlin. (Dent, pp. 98, 253; Beaumont, p. 348; Couling, pp. 333, 354.)
 Ferdinando Busoni (24 June 1834 – 12 May 1909) was Ferruccio Busoni's father and an accomplished clarinet player. Early in 1873, upon returning from a tour and rejoining his family in Trieste, Ferdinando took charge of Ferruccio's piano instruction shortly before the boy's seventh birthday. He also added lessons in composition. Ferruccio wrote his first preserved piece, Canzone, Op. 1 (BV 1), in June of that year. He made his first appearance in public as a pianist in a concert with his parents on 23 November 1873. (Dent, pp. 2, 16-17, 189; Kindermann, p. 21.)
 Luigi Cimoso (†15 or 16 June 1884), a pianist and teacher, was a close friend of Ferruccio Busoni and Busoni's mother Anna. (Dent, p. 24; Beaumont, p. 24.)
 Gomperz Family: In 1875 Ferrucio Busoni enrolled in the Vienna Conservatory. During his time in Vienna he was taken under the wing of the Gomperz family, who were at the center of artistic and intellectual life there. See: Julius Gomperz, Caroline Bettelheim, Theodor Gomperz, Sophie Baroness Todesco, Josephine von Wertheimstein. (Dent, p. 21.)
 Julius Gomperz, a well-known man of letters, married Caroline Bettelheim. He was a member of the Gomperz family: brother to Theodor Gomperz, Sophie Baroness Todesco, and Josephine von Wertheimstein. Julius and Caroline, who were childless, at one point proposed adopting Ferruccio Busoni, but his parents were unwilling to give him up. (Dent, p. 21.)
 Theodor Gomperz (1832-1912) was a historian of philosophy. A member of the Gomperz family: brother to Julius Gomperz, Sophie Baroness Todesco, and Josephine von Wertheimstein. (Dent, p. 21; Seising, p. 65.)
 Ersilia Grusovin was Ferruccio Busoni's cousin and the daughter of Mina Weiß Grusovin, his mother Anna's sister. (Dent, p. 8.)
 Angelo Masini (1844–1926) was an Italian tenor, admired for his portrayal of the title role in Donzetti's Don Sebastiano.
 Gino Tagliapietra (1887-1954) was an Italian pianist and composer. He became a professor at the Liceo Benedetto Marcello, Venice. (Beaumont, 1987, p. 80n.)
 Hermann de Todesco was the husband of Sophie Baroness Todesco (née Gomperz). (Dent, p. 21.)
 Sophie Baroness Todesco (née Gomperz) (1825-1895), wife of Baron Hermann de Todesco; member of the Gomperz family: sister of Theodor Gomperz, Julius Gomperz, and Josephine von Wertheimstein. She provided a tutor for the young Ferruccio Busoni (German and general subjects), and she and her sister Josephine generously contributed money toward his expenses over a period of many years. (Dent, p. 21; Seising, p. 65.)
 Josephine von Wertheimstein (née Gomperz) (1820-1894), a member of the Gomperz family: sister of Theodor Gomperz, Julius Gomperz, and Sophie Baroness Todesco. She and her sister Sophie contributed money toward Ferruccio Busoni's expenses. (Dent, p. 21; Seising, p. 65.)

Notes 

 JUItem, originally part of the Busoni-Archive, reported "lost" after World War II (Sitsky, 1986). More recently it has been revealed that the Jagiellonian University in Cracow has it. (Sitsky, 2008, p. 383)

References 
 
 
 
 
 
 
 
 
 
 
  [First edition, Westport: Greenwood Press, 1986. ]

 
Busoni